The 2001 Japan Series was the 52nd edition of Nippon Professional Baseball's postseason championship series. It matched the Central League champion Yakult Swallows against the Pacific League champion Osaka Kintetsu Buffaloes. The Swallows defeated the Buffaloes in five games to claim their fifth Japan Series championship.

Osaka Kintetsu Buffaloes
Kintetsu had one of the most powerful offenses ever seen in the league. Foreign import Tuffy Rhodes teamed up with Norihiro Nakamura to become one of the most feared hitting tandems in Nippon Professional Baseball history. Rhodes hit 55 home runs to tie the NPB record for most home runs hit in a season, while Nakamura hit 46 home runs of his own. Kintetsu entered the series looking for the franchise's first ever Japan Series win. They lost in 1979 and 1980 to the Hiroshima Toyo Carp and in 1989 against the Yomiuri Giants.

Yakult Swallows
Most of the core team from the 1997 Japan Series championship still remained in Kazuhisa Ishii and all-world catcher Atsuya Furuta.  Shinya Miyamoto anchored the middle of the infield.

Summary 

Game 1

Game 1 would become one of the best pitching performances turned in by any one starter in quite some time.  In fact, it almost became historic.  Yakult ace Kazuhisa Ishii kept the powerful Buffaloes lineup at bay, striking out 12 batters and walking 4.  After walking the first batter of the game, Ishii retired the next 8 batters he faced.  He would no-hit the Buffaloes through 6 and 1/3 innings and eventually shut them out, throwing a complete game.

See also
2001 World Series

References

Japan Series
Tokyo Yakult Swallows
Osaka Kintetsu Buffaloes
Japan Series, 2001
Series